Ricardo Castro Béeche (April 11, 1894 – October 9, 1967) was a Costa Rican lawyer, politician and writer.

Castro Béeche was born in San José, Costa Rica on April 11, 1894, to parents Roberto Castro Solera and Mercedes Béeche Argüello, whose brother, Lic. Octavio Béeche, was the foreign minister of Costa Rica from 1930 to 1931. He received his primary education at Buenaventura Corrales School and his secondary education at the Liceo de Costa Rica. He then went on to graduate from law school to earn a degree in law.

Castro Béeche alternated between public life and journalism. In 1915 he began his career in national politics as Consul General of Costa Rica in New York. In 1924, he served both as an alternate deputy in Congress and as a personal secretary to President Ricardo Jiménez Oreamuno during the same period. He was named Secretary of State in the Office of Foreign Relations and Annexed Affairs (Justice, Grace, Worship and Charity) in 1927.

Briefly switching to journalism, he was Director and General Manager of the Diario de Costa Rica between 1928 and 1934. Castro Béeche also served as a deputy for two consecutive terms (1930–34 and 1934–38). During his second term, he served as the president of congress for one year (1935–36).

1894 births
1967 deaths
Maria Moors Cabot Prize winners
People from San José, Costa Rica
Costa Rican people of Galician descent
Costa Rican politicians
Costa Rican male writers
Costa Rican expatriates in the United States